Victor Cojocaru (born 1 May 1959) is a Romanian former footballer who played as a right defender.

Honours
Universitatea Craiova
Divizia A: 1990–91
Cupa României: 1990–91 
FC U Craiova
Cupa României: 1992–93, runner-up 1993–94

References

1959 births
Living people
Romanian footballers
Association football defenders
Liga I players
Liga II players
CSM Reșița players
Victoria București players
CS Universitatea Craiova players
Romanian football managers